Manes, Mánes or Mánes is a surname. Notable people with the surname include:

 Antonín Mánes (1784–1843), Czech painter
 Donald R. Manes (1934–1986), borough president of Queens, New York
 Édouard Manès (1835–1898), governor general of French India
 Gina Manès (1893–1989), French film actress
 Josef Mánes (1820–1871), Czech painter
 Michelle Manes, American mathematician
 Pablo Curatella Manes (1891–1963), Argentine painter
 Quido Mánes (1828–1880), Czech painter

See also 
 Mánes Union of Fine Arts, a Czech arts organization
 Mannes, a surname
 Mane (disambiguation)
 Mani (disambiguation)
 Manassas (disambiguation)
 Manasses (disambiguation)